Alcalá, Alcalà or Alcala may refer to:

People
Alcalá (surname), includes a list of people with that name

Places

Bolivia
Alcalá (Tomina), a town in Bolivia

Colombia
Alcalá, Valle del Cauca, Colombia

Philippines
Alcala, Cagayan, a municipality in the Philippines
Alcala, Pangasinan, a municipality in the Philippines

Spain
Alcalá de Ebro, a town in Zaragoza, Spain
Alcalá de Guadaíra, a town in Seville, Spain
Alcalá de Gurrea, a town in Huesca, Spain
Alcalá de Henares, a city close to Madrid
Comarca de Alcalá, a comarca (district) in Madrid, Spain
Alcalá del Júcar, a town in Albacete, Spain
Alcalá de la Vega, a town in Cuenca, Spain
Alcalá de los Gazules, a town in Cádiz, Spain
Alcalá de Moncayo, a town in Zaragoza, Spain
Alcalá del Río, a town in Seville, Spain
Alcalá del Valle, a town in Cádiz, Spain
Alcalà de Xivert, a town in Castellón, Spain
Alcalá la Real, a town in Jaén, Spain
Alcalá de la Selva, a town in Teruel, Spain
La Vall d'Alcalà (Spanish: Vall de Alcalá), a valley in the Marina Alta region of Alicante, Spain

Sport
CD Alcalá, a football team based in Alcalá de Guadaira, Spain
RSD Alcalá, a football team based in Alcalá de Henares, Spain

Other uses
University of Alcalá, Alcalá de Henares, Spain
Puerta de Alcalá, a monument in Madrid
Calle de Alcalá, one of the main streets of Madrid
Alcalá 20 nightclub fire, 1983
Alcalá (TransMilenio), a station of the TransMilenio system in Bogotá, Colombia

See also

Alcazaba (disambiguation) 
Alcazar (disambiguation) 
Alcántara (disambiguation)
 Alcalus, a genus of frogs
Al Qala, location of the Bahrain Fort
Mission San Diego de Alcalá, the first Spanish mission on the American Pacific Coast